Gérard Mentor Laurent (ca. 1933 – 9 April 2001) was a Haitian historian and educator. Some of his most notable works are Coup d'Oeil sur la Politique de Toussaint Louverture (1945), Six Etudes sur J. J. Dessalines (1951), Pages d'Histoire d'Haïti (1960), Le Commissaire Sonthonax à Saint-Domingue (4 volumes, 1965–1974), and Haiti et l'Indépendance Américaine (1976).

References

External links
 Six études sur J.J. Dessalines, full text openly available for all from the Digital Library of the Caribbean

1933 births
2001 deaths
20th-century Haitian historians
Haitian male writers
20th-century male writers